Hans Jørgen Boye (born 30 June 1942) is a retired Danish rower who had his best achievements in the coxless pairs, partnering with Peter Christiansen. In this event, they won two European medals, in 1964 and 1965, and finished in fifth place at the 1964 Summer Olympics.

References

1942 births
Living people
Danish male rowers
Olympic rowers of Denmark
Rowers at the 1964 Summer Olympics
People from Langeland Municipality
European Rowing Championships medalists
Sportspeople from the Region of Southern Denmark